Mark Preston Curry (born 27 August 1961) is an English actor as well as a television and radio presenter. He is an actor and writer, known for Bugsy Malone (1976) with his role of Oscar, Hollyoaks (1995) and Eartha Kitt Sings (1970). He is best known for his career on the British-television children's show Blue Peter (1986–1989) as a host, as well as his run as host on ITV British gameshow Catchphrase (2002).

Early years 
Born in Stafford, Curry grew up in the mining village of Allerton Bywater near Castleford in the West Riding of Yorkshire. His father, Arthur, a physical training instructor and prison officer, died when Curry was five. His mother, Lily, was a maternity nurse. 

Curry's television career began when he was seven, when he auditioned for Jess Yates, the executive producer of Yorkshire Television's Junior Showtime. He was a regular performer on the show from 1969 to 1974. He attended the Jean Pearce School of Dancing in Leeds throughout the early 1970s.

In 1976 he appeared in the Alan Parker film, Bugsy Malone playing "Oscar". He performed in pantomimes and variety shows. Curry didn't enjoy school and he found it to be an annoying distraction, as he enjoyed performing and acting to a greater extent.

Curry has appeared in many pantomimes throughout the UK. His first was a television pantomime in 1972, Babes in the Wood, starring Little and Large and Susan Maughan, where Curry and Bonnie Langford were the two babes.

In the late 1970s, Curry co-presented a Saturday morning TV show called Calendar Kids, with Kathryn Apanowicz, which was only shown in the Yorkshire Television region. He was also a main character in a six episode comedy/drama series about brass bands, Sounding Brass, for ATV.

1980–1989 
Curry joined the Harrogate Theatre Company and appeared in several plays over three years in the early 1980s. In 1981, he co-hosted the series Get Set For Summer on BBC1 with main host Peter Powell and Lucie Skeaping. The series returned the following year as Get Set but eventually became The Saturday Picture Show with Curry as main host, running until 1986. Curry's co-hosts over the years included Deborah Appleby, Maggie Philbin and Cheryl Baker. Curry moved to Manchester to present Saturday morning live TV shows for the BBC and then moved to London to present Blue Peter in the late 1980's.

In 1984, Curry was the question master on the final series of BBC quiz show Screen Test.

Blue Peter: 1986–1989
On 23 June 1986, Curry joined the children's television program Blue Peter. Curry's co-hosts during his time with the program were Janet Ellis, Peter Duncan, Caron Keating, Yvette Fielding and John Leslie.

Curry spent three weeks in Malawi witnessing distressing scenes of people from surrounding villages suffering with blindness and chronic eye problems. He had an eye operation when he was two years old and has to wear spectacles due to only seeing clearly through one eye, so was enthusiastic about raising money for the charity, SightSavers, which was the Blue Peter appeal for 1986.

He travelled across the Soviet Union for the 1987 summer expedition and was known for his history features on the show, his cooking disasters and his performing. Due to Curry's successful children's history program Treasure Houses, created by Dorothy Smith and the head of children's programmes, Edward Barnes, he was invited to replace Simon Groom without auditioning for the show.

The team of Curry, Keating and Fielding during the 1980s was popular at the time and they worked together on the program's Christmas song and dance specials. After leaving Blue Peter in June 1989, Curry was offered another BBC One Saturday morning show but turned it down.

1990–1999
Curry played the role of a TV host in a 1990 episode of the ITV drama London's Burning. He appeared in an episode of the BBC comedy series, Bread, and when Roy Castle became ill during the mid-1990s, Curry was asked to co present Record Breakers for the BBC. Curry played one of the two leading roles in the London West End production of The Woman in Black, in 1994 and starred in the centenary production of Charley's Aunt. Curry has appeared in a UK tour of Noises Off and in the stage musical version of Singin' in the Rain. He has also appeared at the Theatre Royal, Windsor in several Alan Ayckbourn plays.

Curry, who is a keen tennis player and a qualified tennis coach, joined the Radio 5 commentary team for their coverage of Wimbledon in the early 1990s. He is the regular Master of Ceremonies for the Aegon Classic, a pre-Wimbledon women's tennis tournament at the Priory Club, Edgbaston.

Curry presented the DIY BBC One daytime series Change That from 1996-1998.

He would often sit in regularly for Gloria Hunniford on Channel 5's Open House.

He also co-presented a daily, live food series on the Carlton Food Network called Taste Today with Ruth Langsford and later, Anthea Turner. This series saw Curry travel to Italy, Cyprus, India and Singapore, covering various food topics.

2000-2009

Catchphrase (2002) 
In 2002, Curry presented the final series of the original run of the television quiz show, Catchphrase. The show was cancelled after this series but was revived in 2013 with Stephen Mulhern presenting the show.

Other shows/ Performances 
Curry made a guest appearance in an episode of Last of the Summer Wine, entitled "Will The Nearest Alien Please Come In", broadcast 19 August 2007, playing a character trying to get in touch with extra terrestrials. He was also cast in an episode of the BBC daytime drama Doctors.

Victoria Wood cast Curry as 'The Compere' in a 2009 revival of her play Talent, which she also directed at the Menier Chocolate Factory, London.

2010-present 
From 9 January, until the late summer of 2012, he presented the breakfast radio show, Curry For Breakfast on Talk Radio Europe, an English language talk/variety network in southern Spain, where he has a home.  He played a leading role in Wife Begins at Forty, for Ray Cooney at the Yvonne Arnaud Theatre, Guildford and the Mill, at Sonning in 2011 and 2012 and returned to Sonning in 2013 in the comedy, Who's Under Where?.

He played the role of Larry in Sondheim's Company and Andre Cassell in Victor/Victoria, at the London fringe venue Southwark Playhouse in 2011 and 2012.

He has presented and performed in several BBC Children in Need television shows, once playing Cliff Richard in a Eurovision Song Contest tribute singing "Congratulations" and "Power To All Our Friends".

He has commentated at Wimbledon for BBC Radio 5, Radio Wimbledon and for Talk Radio Europe. He has also contributed to ITV's Piers Morgan's Life Stories, discussing his friendship with actress Beverley Callard known for her role in Coronation Street.

He featured on the BBC One quiz show Pointless in December 2012 alongside Peter Duncan as contestants. He has also appeared as a celebrity guest on Celebrity Antiques Roadshow, and he even won the BBC Children In Need Strictly Come Dancing special. From May to August 2014, he played  "Siegfried Farnon" in the stage adaptation and UK tour of "All Creatures Great and Small".

In 2016 he played the role of the Wizard in the West End musical Wicked.

As a fund-raiser for the Acting For Others YouTube channel in 2020, Curry recorded a series of virtual interviews with other performers. He recorded a food and travel vlog from Bilbao and San Sebastián for The Wonderbirds Show.

Personal life 

Curry has a daughter and a granddaughter. In September 2008, Curry formed a civil partnership with his long-term partner, Jeremy Sandle.

References

External links 

1961 births
Living people
Blue Peter presenters
English television presenters
English game show hosts
English LGBT people
People from Stafford
British LGBT broadcasters
People educated at Lawnswood School